Steven Orville "Steve" Williams (born May 24, 1951) is an American politician and current judge in Fairfield County, Ohio. He formerly served as the state Senator of the 31st District, from 1991 to 1993.

References

1951 births
Republican Party Ohio state senators
Republican Party members of the Ohio House of Representatives
Living people
Politicians from Columbus, Ohio
People from Fairfield County, Ohio